Marius Radu can refer to:

 Marius Radu (footballer) (born 1977), a Romanian footballer
 Marius Radu (swimmer) (born 1992), a Romanian swimmer